Stockophorus charitopa is a moth of the family Pterophoridae and the only member of the genus Stockophorus. It is known from Bolivia.

The wingspan is about 14 mm. Adults are on wing in September.

References

Platyptiliini
Monotypic moth genera
Moths of South America
Taxa named by Cees Gielis